Hapoel Haifa Basketball Club is a professional basketball team based in Haifa, Israel. The club plays in the Israeli Basketball Premier League, the top tier of Israeli basketball. It was founded in 1924, and is owned by Hapoel Haifa Supporters Trust - Ultras Gate 5.

History
Hapoel Haifa was founded in 1924.  It began to play basketball in the Israeli Basketball Premier League in 1955. 

The club has a rich history, and has been part of the Israeli Basketball Premier League for many years. Hapoel Haifa finished as runner-up to Maccabi Tel Aviv in 1962 and 1965.  It came in second in the competition for the Israeli State Cup, in 1970/1971, 1984/1985, 2008/2009, and 2012/2013.

In the 2011/12 season, its fans formed the club again. Hapoel Haifa was Israeli Artzit League Group North Runner-Up in 2015, and Champion in 2016, and Israeli National League Runner-Up in 2020.

Hapoel Haifa plays its home games in Romema Arena.

Roster

Depth chart

Honors

Domestic Championship:
Runners-up (1): 1961-62, 
Israeli National League:
Champions (1): 1998-99
Liga Bet:
Champions (1): 2006-07
Liga Alef:
Champions (1): 2007-08
Liga Artzit:
Champions (1): 2008-09
Champions (2): 2015/16

Notable players

 
 Shimon Amsalem 
 Stanley Brundy
 Cory Carr
 Guy Goodes
 Adi Gordon
 Mickey Gorka
 Albert Hemmo
 Howard Lassoff
 Barry Leibowitz
 Jake Pemberton
 Hubert Roberts
 Isaac Rosefelt
 Jerry Simon
 Bar Timor
Igal Volodarsky 
 John Willis
 Jahmar Young
 Tony Younger
Chaim Zlotikman

References

External links
 Official website
 Hapoel Haifa at Eurobasket.com

Basketball teams in Israel
Basketball teams established in 1924
Hapoel Haifa
Israeli Basketball Premier League teams
Hapoel basketball clubs
Fan-owned sports teams
1924 establishments in Mandatory Palestine